May Assembly was the national assembly of the Serbs in Austrian Empire, held on 1 and 3 May 1848 in Sremski Karlovci, during which the Serbs proclaimed autonomous Serbian Vojvodina. This action was later recognized by the supreme Austrian authority in Vienna. The May Assembly was part of the European Revolutions of 1848.

Prelude
After news of the Paris revolution of 1848 reached the Austrian Empire, the absolutist reign of Klemens Wenzel, Prince von Metternich was weakened. At this time the regions of Banat, Bačka and Syrmia were administratively divided between the Habsburg Kingdom of Hungary (in the north) and the Habsburg Military Frontier (in the south). A sizeable percent of the Austrian soldiers serving on the Military Frontier were ethnic Serbs, who protected Austrian borders in exchange for certain political freedoms that they were able to enjoy within the frontier, whose administration functioned independently from the county-system of the Habsburg Kingdom of Hungary.

After the outbreak of the revolution in the Habsburg Kingdom of Hungary on 15 March 1848, the new government of the kingdom refused to accept the Serbs' request for recognition of their national rights, taking a stance that all citizens of the Kingdom of Hungary are Hungarians. Serbs, whose national rights and freedoms were previously regulated within the Habsburg monarchy saw the Hungarian position as a degradation of their status. After the initial Serb political demands for recognition of their national rights were rejected by the new government of the Kingdom of Hungary, Serb demands became more radical and the Serb national movement turned against the new revolutionary government of the Kingdom of Hungary.

Assembly
Realizing that Hungarian revolutionary leaders are not willing to recognize national rights of the Serbs, political leaders of the Serbs decided to hold an assembly on which a separate Serb voivodeship within Austrian Empire would be proclaimed.

Assembly was held on 1–3 May 1848 in Sremski Karlovci (a town within the Habsburg Military Frontier). The beginning of the May Assembly was declared from the balcony of Sremski Karlovci City Hall. The assembly proclaimed a creation of Serbian Vojvodina and its political alliance with the Triune Kingdom of Croatia, Slavonia and Dalmatia.

During the assembly, Serbian Orthodox Metropolitan Josif Rajačić was elevated to the dignity of the Serbian patriarch (a title formerly held by Arsenije Čarnojević) while Stevan Šupljikac was declared for a Voivode (duke) of the newly formed voivodeship.  Đorđe Stratimirović was elected for the Vožd (leader of Serb national movement).

The decisions of the Assembly
The assembly officially adopted the following decisions:

 Serb nation is politically free and independent under the House of Austria and general Hungarian crown.
 We proclaiming Serbian Vojvodina, which includes Syrmia with the Frontier, Baranja, Bačka with the Bečej District and the Šajkaš Battalion, Banat with the Frontier and the Kikinda District.
 Serbian Vojvodina forming the political alliance with the Triune Kingdom of Croatia, Slavonia and Dalmatia.
 Permanent People's Board is formed, as an executive body of the People's Assembly.
 We recognizing Vlach (Romanian) ethnic independence.
 We appointing the Board which will bring these decisions in front of the Emperor and the Croatian Assembly.
 We appointing delegation for the Slavic Congress in Prague.

Aftermath
Decisions of the May Assembly were later recognized by the Austrian emperor, who reciprocated to Serbs for participating in the war against Hungarian rebels by official formation of a separate crownland named Voivodeship of Serbia and Banat of Temeschwar (formed in 1849). The new Voivodeship was independent from Habsburg Kingdom of Hungary and was directly subordinated to Vienna. It consisted of the regions of Banat, Bačka and Syrmia (municipalities of Ilok and Ruma), excluding parts that were within the Habsburg Military Frontier. This Voivodeship, however, had somewhat different borders from Serbian Vojvodina that was proclaimed in 1848 and essentially functioned as an administrative district. It was more ethnically mixed and included eastern parts of Banat with mainly Romanian population, while parts of the Military Frontier in which Serbs formed the majority were not included into new Habsburg crownland.

See also
 Serbian Vojvodina
 Voivodeship of Serbia and Banat of Temeschwar
 History of Vojvodina
 History of Serbia

References

Further reading

External links
 About May Assembly (Serbian)

Serbian Revolution
Serbian Vojvodina
History of Syrmia
Revolutions of 1848 in the Austrian Empire
1848 in Serbia
1848 in the Austrian Empire